Mexx Meerdink (born 24 July 2003) is a Dutch footballer who plays for Jong AZ in the Eerste Divisie.

Early life
He is the son of former professional footballer Martijn Meerdink. From Winterswijk, Meerdink was in the youth academy at de Graafschap from 2012 until 2021 when he signed up to Jong AZ.

Career
Meerdink made his league debut in the Eerste Divisie on 10 December 2021, appearing as a substitute in a 3-2 away defeat to ADO Den Haag. Meerdink made his first start on 21 January, 2022 against VVV Venlo in a youthful team that won 2-0 and in doing so earning the club their first win in four months. As well as Meerdink making a first start, Misha Engel and Lewis Schouten did as well. The oldest starting player for Jong AZ was 22 year-old Czech Richard Sedláček.

References

External links

2003 births
Living people
Eerste Divisie players
Jong AZ players
Dutch footballers
Association football forwards
AZ Alkmaar players